Debbie Healy Hammons (born November 27, 1950) is a former Democratic member of the Wyoming House of Representatives, representing the 27th district from 2005 to 2011.

External links
Wyoming State Legislature - Representative Debbie Healy Hammons official WY Senate website
Project Vote Smart - Representative Debbie Healy Hammons (WY) profile
Follow the Money - Debbie Healy Hammons
2006 2004 campaign contributions

Democratic Party members of the Wyoming House of Representatives
1950 births
Living people
Women state legislators in Wyoming
People from Worland, Wyoming
21st-century American women